Daebang-dong is a dong, neighbourhood of Dongjak-gu in Seoul, South Korea.

History

See also 
Administrative divisions of South Korea

References

External links
Map and statistics of Dongjak-gu

Neighbourhoods of Dongjak District